William Hector McMillan (24 January 1892 – 8 September 1974) was a Liberal party member of the House of Commons of Canada. He was born in Blenheim, Ontario and became a physician by career.

He was first elected at the Welland riding in a 16 October 1950 by-election, then won successive terms there in the 1953, 1957, 1958, 1962 and 1963 federal elections. McMillan left Parliament in 1965 after completing his term in the 26th Canadian Parliament and did not seek further re-election.

External links
 

1892 births
1974 deaths
Physicians from Ontario
Mayors of Thorold
Members of the House of Commons of Canada from Ontario
Liberal Party of Canada MPs